Live at Manchester Craftsmen's Guild is an album by the Count Basie Orchestra that won the Grammy Award for Best Large Jazz Ensemble Album in 1997. The orchestra is led by Grover Mitchell and features four songs with New York Voices.

Track listing

Personnel
Credits adapted from AllMusic.

 Grover Mitchell – conductor
 Mike Williams – flugelhorn, trumpet
 Scotty Barnhart – flugelhorn, trumpet
 Clarence Banks – trombone
 Alvin Walker II – trombone
 Mel Wanzo – trombone
 Emmanuel Boyd – flute, alto saxophone
 Doug Miller – arranger, flute, tenor saxophone
 John Williams – bass clarinet, baritone saxophone
 Will Matthews – guitar
 George Caldwell – piano
 Brian Grice – drums

New York Voices
 Peter Eldridge – backing vocals
 Darmon Meader – arranger, backing vocals
 Kim Nazarian – backing vocals
 Lauren Kinhan – backing vocals

Production
 Marty Ashby – producer
 Dino DiStefano – engineer
 Jay Dudt – engineer, mixing
 Jay Ashby – mixing

References

1996 live albums
Grammy Award for Best Large Jazz Ensemble Album
Big band albums
Count Basie albums
Live jazz albums